The 1978 Chicago Cubs season was the 107th season of the Chicago Cubs franchise, the 103rd in the National League and the 63rd at Wrigley Field. The Cubs finished third in the National League East with a record of 79–83.

Offseason 
 October 13, 1977: Keith Drumright was traded by the Cubs to the Houston Astros for Al Javier.
 October 31, 1977: Bill Bonham was traded by the Cubs to the Cincinnati Reds to the Chicago Cubs for Woodie Fryman and Bill Caudill.
 December 5, 1977: Dave Rosello was traded by the Cubs to the Cleveland Indians for Bruce Compton (minors) and Norm Churchill (minors).
 December 5, 1977: Jesús Figueroa was drafted by the Cubs from the New York Yankees in the 1977 rule 5 draft.

Regular season 
On June 14, in Cincinnati, Pete Rose of the Cincinnati Reds singled in the first inning off Cubs pitcher Dave Roberts; Rose would proceed to get a hit in every game he played until August 1.

Season standings

Record vs. opponents

Notable transactions 
 June 6, 1978: Mike Diaz was drafted by the Cubs in the 30th round of the 1978 Major League Baseball draft.
 June 9, 1978: Woodie Fryman was traded by the Cubs to the Montreal Expos for a player to be named later. The Expos completed the deal by sending Jerry White to the Cubs on June 23.
 June 10, 1978: The Cubs traded a player to be named later to the New York Yankees for Ken Holtzman. The Cubs completed the trade by sending Ron Davis to the Yankees on June 12.
 June 15, 1978: Joe Wallis was traded by the Cubs to the Cleveland Indians for Mike Vail.
 June 26, 1978: Paul Reuschel was traded by the Cubs to the Cleveland Indians for Dennis DeBarr.

Roster

Player stats

Batting

Starters by position 
Note: Pos = Position; G = Games played; AB = At bats; H = Hits; Avg. = Batting average; HR = Home runs; RBI = Runs batted in

Other batters 
Note: G = Games played; AB = At bats; H = Hits; Avg. = Batting average; HR = Home runs; RBI = Runs batted in

Pitching

Starting pitchers 
Note: G = Games pitched; IP = Innings pitched; W = Wins; L = Losses; ERA = Earned run average; SO = Strikeouts

Other pitchers 
Note: G = Games pitched; IP = Innings pitched; W = Wins; L = Losses; ERA = Earned run average; SO = Strikeouts

Relief pitchers 
Note: G = Games pitched; W = Wins; L = Losses; SV = Saves; ERA = Earned run average; SO = Strikeouts

Farm system 

LEAGUE CHAMPIONS: Geneva

Notes

References 

1978 Chicago Cubs season at Baseball Reference

Chicago Cubs seasons
Chicago Cubs season
Chicago Cubs